Keondrick Louis Lyn (born March 5, 1992) is an American football cornerback who is a free agent. He played college football at Syracuse. Lyn signed with the Indianapolis Colts as an undrafted free agent in 2014.

Early life
Lyn attended Miramar High School, where he helped lead his high school football team to a state championship in his senior season in 2009. Lyn was named a 2009 Broward County All-Star. Lyn recorded 119 tackles and five interceptions including returning one for a touchdown in his senior season. Lyn also participated in track & field.

Professional career

Indianapolis Colts
In May 2014, Lyn signed with the Indianapolis Colts as an undrafted free agent following the 2014 NFL Draft. On June 16, 2014, Lyn was waived by the Colts.

Winnipeg Blue Bombers
On April 16, 2015, Lyn signed with the Winnipeg Blue Bombers of the Canadian Football League.

Jacksonville Sharks
On July 16, 2015, Lyn signed with the Jacksonville Sharks of the Arena Football League. Lyn only played in one game with the Jacksonville Sharks.

New York Jets
On August 7, 2015, Lyn signed with the New York Jets.

Hamilton Tiger-Cats
Lyn signed with the Hamilton Tiger-Cats on January 16, 2017. He was released on May 10, 2018.

BC Lions
Lyn signed with the BC Lions in September 2018. He re-signed with the Lions on July 3, 2019. He was released during final roster cuts on June 8, 2019, and signed to the team's practice roster. He was released from the practice roster on July 23, 2019.

Edmonton Eskimos
Lyn signed with the Edmonton Eskimos' practice roster on November 5, 2019.

BC Lions (second stint)
Lyn re-signed with the BC Lions on January 14, 2020. He was released on January 5, 2021.

References

External links
Syracuse Orange football bio
Arena Football League bio
Jacksonville Sharks bio
New York Jets bio

1992 births
Living people
American football cornerbacks
BC Lions players
Edmonton Elks players
Hamilton Tiger-Cats players
Jacksonville Sharks players
New York Jets players
People from Miramar, Florida
Syracuse Orange football players
Sportspeople from Broward County, Florida
Players of Canadian football from Florida